David Derepas (born 9 March 1978 in Dijon) is a French cyclist. He started his career as a mountain biker with Team Lapierre, before moving on to compete on the road, track and in cyclo-cross. He also rode in the 2003 and 2004 editions of the Giro d'Italia.

Major results

Road
1999
 3rd Time trial, World Military Road Championships
 10th Road race, UCI Road World Under–23 Championships
2000
 6th National Road Race Championships

Track

2005
 2nd Stayers, National Track Championships
2006
 1st  Stayers, National Track Championships
2007
 1st  Stayers, National Track Championships
2008
 2nd Stayers, National Track Championships
2009
 1st  Stayers, National Track Championships
2010
 1st  Stayers, National Track Championships
2011
 2nd Stayers, National Track Championships
2012
 2nd Stayers, National Track Championships
2013
 3rd Stayers, National Track Championships

Cyclo-cross

1995–1996
 2nd National Junior Cyclo-cross Championships
 5th Junior race, UCI Cyclo-cross World Championships
1996–1997
 2nd National Under–23 Cyclo-cross Championships
1997–1998
 2nd National Under–23 Cyclo-cross Championships
1998–1999
 8th Under–23 race, UCI Cyclo-cross World Championships
1999–2000
 1st  National Under–23 Cyclo-cross Championships
 4th Under–23 race, UCI Cyclo-cross World Championships
2001–2002
 2nd National Cyclo-cross Championships
2013–2014
 1st  World Masters 35–39 Cyclo-cross Championships
2016–2017
 1st  National Masters 35–39 Cyclo-cross Championships

References

External links
 
 

1978 births
Living people
French male cyclists
French track cyclists
Cyclo-cross cyclists
Sportspeople from Dijon
Cyclists from Bourgogne-Franche-Comté
20th-century French people
21st-century French people